The Canadian five-dollar note is the lowest denomination and one of the most common banknotes issued by the Bank of Canada.

As with all modern Canadian banknotes, all text is in both English and French (see Official bilingualism in Canada).

Current note

The current five-Canadian dollar note, part of the Frontier Series, is predominantly blue and was introduced 7 November 2013, using the same technology found in the $20, $50 and $100. The bill features a portrait of Canada's seventh prime minister Sir Wilfrid Laurier and hologram of the Mackenzie Tower from the West Block on Parliament Hill on the front; the back features an astronaut working with Dextre attached to the Canadarm2.

The front of the previous note also features Sir Wilfrid Laurier, the coat of arms, and a picture of the West Block of the Parliament buildings, but in a different layout from the current note. The reverse side depicts children engaged in winter sports, including sledding, ice skating, and hockey; this is accompanied by a quotation from Roch Carrier's short story, "The Hockey Sweater":

The winters of my childhood were long, long seasons. We lived in three places—the school, the church and the skating rink—but our real life was on the skating rink.

In the image, one of the hockey players, notably a girl, wears a hockey sweater number 9 to honour Canadian hockey legend Maurice Richard, idolized in Carrier's story.

This note features raised, textured printing as well as a special tactile feature (similar to Braille dots) to assist the blind in identifying the denomination. Security features include 'BANK OF CANADA' and 'BANQUE DU CANADA' visible only under ultraviolet light, and yellow dots representing the EURion constellation on the reverse side. .

Series history

Five-dollar coin
In 2005, the Canadian government polled its citizens on the idea of retiring the five-dollar note, replacing it with a five-dollar coin. The money saved in making the coin would then fund the Canadian Olympic team. Canadians resoundingly rejected and ridiculed the idea of a five-dollar coin. Some pointed out the note's most recent redesign took place only four years prior, while many others were averse to the idea of carrying yet another coin in their wallets and pockets. Due to the overwhelmingly negative response, plans for the five-dollar coin were discarded. Instead, on 15 November 2006, the Bank of Canada released an updated version of the five-dollar note (issue of 2006) with updated security features, including a holographic stripe found in the rest of the series, and a watermark of Laurier that appears when held to the light. These features replaced the iridescent maple leaves that were in the issue of 2002.

"Spocking Fives"

For years, Canadians have been known to deface certain editions of the five-dollar note by using ink pens to alter Laurier's features to resemble Spock, the Star Trek character portrayed by Leonard Nimoy. In 2002, the Bank of Canada officially objected to "any mutilation or defacement of banknotes", which could shorten the lifespan of the currency. When "Spocking" surged in 2015 following Nimoy's death, the Bank reminded people that, while the practice is not illegal and the notes remain legal tender and "a symbol of our country and a source of national pride", defacing the bill could damage its security features and lead retailers to refuse them. The 2013 issue of the note features an image of Laurier with less resemblance to Spock.

Polymer notes
In 2020 a short-list of eight "bank NOTE-able" Canadians to be portrayed on the $5 vertical polymer bills in place of Laurier was selected from 600 nominees: Terry Fox, Crowfoot, Pitseolak Ashoona, Robertine Barry, Binaaswi, Won Alexander Cumyow, Lotta Hitschmanova and Fred Loft, with the final decision to be made by the Minister of Finance.

References

External links
 Bank of Canada's banknote page

Banknotes of Canada by denomination
Wilfrid Laurier
Five-base-unit banknotes